The Adventures of Oktyabrina is a 1924 Soviet/Russian silent film, an eccentric comedy, directed by Grigori Kozintsev and Leonid Trauberg. This film is presumed lost, as it and many other early Russian films are believed to have been destroyed in a studio fire in 1925.

FEKS (ФЭКС) stands for  «Фабрика эксцентрического актёра», "Factory of the Eccentric Actor", and The  adventures of Oktyabrina was their first work.

Synopsis
Oktyabrina, a female Komsomol member and a building superintendent evict a "Nepman" to the roof of the building for persistent non-payment of the rent. There the Nepman opens a bottle of beer, from which a "Coolidge Curzon Poincaré" emerges. The name is concocted to be an epitome of evil, made from the names of the anti-Soviet politicians of the time, routinely bashed in the Soviet press. Together the Nepman and the genie plot to rob Gosbank, but are deterred by Oktyabrina with the help of fellow Komsomol members and engineering marvels of the time.

Cast
 Zinaida Tarakhovskaya - Oktyabrina 
 Yevgeni Kumeyko - Nepman
 Sergei Martinson - Coolidge Curzon Poincare	
 Antonio Tserep

References

External links

1924 films
1924 comedy films
Soviet comedy films
Russian comedy films
Soviet silent short films
Soviet black-and-white films
Films directed by Grigori Kozintsev
Films directed by Leonid Trauberg
Lenfilm films
Lost Russian films
1924 lost films
Lost comedy films
1924 directorial debut films
1924 short films
Russian silent short films
Russian black-and-white films
Lost Soviet films
Silent comedy films
1920s Russian-language films